Sphaerion lentiginosum is a species of beetle in the family Cerambycidae. It was described by Carlos Berg in 1889.

References

Elaphidiini
Beetles described in 1889